Nathanaël (born 1970 in Montreal) is a Canadian writer, literary translator and educator. Some of her works have been published under her legal name Nathalie Stephens. She lives in Chicago.

Biography 
In 1970 Nathanaël was born as Nathalie Stephens in Montreal. She studied Literature at the Lumière University Lyon 2 and the York University, Toronto. Since 2002 she is member of the Québec Union of Writers. She teaches at the School of the Art Institute of Chicago. Furthermore, she is a contributing editor to the French online magazine Recours au poème and the American magazine Aufgabe.

Nathanaël writes intergenre, poetry, prose, and essays — in English and French — which have been translated into Bulgarian, Basque, Greek, Portuguese, Slovenian and Spanish. Her book Underground was finalist for a Grand Prix du Salon du livre de Toronto in 2000. L'injure was shortlisted for a Prix Trillium and the Prix Alain-Grandbois in 2005. ...s'arrête? Je won the Prix Alain-Grandbois in 2008.

Nathanaël has translated John Keene, Trish Salah, Reginald Gibbons, Bhanu Kapil, R. M. Vaughan et al. into French and Hervé Guibert, Danielle Collobert, Hilda Hilst, Édouard Glissant and Catherine Mavrikakis into English. Her translation of Danielle Collobert's novel Murder was shortlisted for a Best Translated Book Award 2014. She has been awarded with fellowships from the PEN American Center (2012) and the Centre national du livre de France (2013) for her translation of Hervé Guibert's The Mausoleum of Lovers.

Selected writings 
The Middle Notebooks. New York: Nightboat, 2015 .
Asclepias The Milkweeds. New York: Nightboat, 2015 .
Laisse. Paris: Recours au poème éditeurs, 2015 .
Sotto l'immagine. Montréal: Mémoire d'encrier, 2014 .
Sisyphus, Outdone. Theatres of the Catastrophal. New York: Nightboat, 2013 .
Carnet de délibérations. Montréal: Le Quartanier, 2011 .
We Press Ourselves Plainly. New York: Nightboat, 2010 .
Vigilous, Reel. Desire (a)s accusation. San Francisco: Albion, 2010.
Carnet de désaccords. Montréal: Le Quartanier, 2009 .
At Alberta. Toronto: BookThug, 2008 .
...s'arrête? Je. Montréal: Éditions de l'Hexagone, 2007 .
The Sorrow And The Fast Of It. New York: Nightboat Books, 2007 .
L'absence au lieu (Claude Cahun et le livre inouvert). Québec: Nota Bene, 2007 .
Touch To Affliction. Toronto: Coach House Books, 2006 .
L'injure. Montréal: Éditions de l'Hexagone, 2004 .
Paper City. A caprice on the subject of disillusionment. Toronto: Coach House Books, 2003 .
Je Nathanaël. Montréal: L'Hexagone, 2003 .
L'embrasure. Laval: Éditions TROIS, 2002 .
All Boy. Calgary: housepress, 2001 .
Somewhere Running. Vancouver: Arsenal Pulp Press, 2000 .
Underground. Laval: Éditions TROIS, 1999 .
Colette m'entends-tu? Laval: Éditions TROIS, 1997 .
This Imagined Permanence. Toronto: Gutter Press, 1996 .
hivernale. Toronto: Éditions du GREF, 1995 .

Translations 
Édouard Glissant, Sun of Consciousness. New York: Nightboat, 2020 .
Hervé Guibert, The Mausoleum of Lovers Journals 1976–1991. New York: Nightboat 2014, .
Danielle Collobert, Murder. New York: Litmus Press, 2013 .
Hilda Hilst, The Obscene Madame D. New York: Nightboat, 2014  (with Rachel Gontijo Araújo).
Édouard Glissant, Poetic Intention. New York: Nightboat, 2010 .
Catherine Mavrikakis, Flowers of Spit. BookThug, 2011 .
Catherine Mavrikakis, A Cannibal and Melancholy Mourning. Coach House, 2004 .

Awards and recognition
2013 Residential bursary from the Collège International de Traducteurs Littéraires (Arles)
2013 Bursary from the Centre national du livre
2012 PEN Translation Fund Fellowship
2008 Prix Alain-Grandbois for ...s'arrête? Je 
2003 British Centre for Literary Translation Residential Bursary of the University of East Anglia 
2002 Chalmers Fellowship

References

External links
Nathanaël and Ronaldo V. Wilson, Queering Poetics: A Reading by Nathalie Stephens/Nathanaël and Ronaldo V. Wilson at the Northwestern University (2012, audio: 31 min.).
Nathanaël, Hatred of Translation (essay, 2015)
Nathanaël, Traduction (soi-)disant : une expropriation d'intimités (essay, French, 2010).
Nathanaël, Pages enlevées (extract, French).
Nathanaël, Sisyphus, Outdone. Theatres of the Catastrophal (extract).
Judith Goldman, „A Failed Snapshot (instantané raté): Notes on Nathanaël (Nathalie Stephens), SISYPHUS, OUTDONE. Theatres of the Catastrophal" in: Postmodern Culture: Journal of Interdisciplinary Thought on Contemporary Cultures 20/3 (2010).

1970 births
Living people
20th-century Canadian poets
21st-century Canadian poets
20th-century Canadian novelists
21st-century Canadian novelists
Writers from Montreal
Canadian women poets
Canadian women novelists
Canadian LGBT poets
21st-century Canadian women writers
20th-century Canadian women writers
Prix Alain-Grandbois
21st-century Canadian LGBT people
20th-century Canadian LGBT people